Donaudorf may refer to several places in Austria:

 a cadastral community in Gedersdorf, Lower Austria
 a cadastral community in the municipal Ybbs an der Donau, Melk District Lower Austria